Isaac Cox Cobblestone Farmstead, also known as the Letson Farm, is a historic home and farm complex located in the town of Wheatland near Scottsville in Monroe County, New York. The complex includes a Federal style cobblestone farmhouse built about 1838. It is constructed of small to medium-sized field cobbles and is one of seven surviving cobblestone buildings in the town of Wheatland.  Also on the expansive property are a pair of Wells truss barns, 19th century combination corn crib / pig sty, and small 19th century smokehouse.

It was listed on the National Register of Historic Places in 2003.

References

Houses on the National Register of Historic Places in New York (state)
Cobblestone architecture
Federal architecture in New York (state)
Houses completed in 1838
Houses in Monroe County, New York
National Register of Historic Places in Monroe County, New York